The Super DIRTcar Series Big Block Modifieds is a North American big block modified touring series currently promoted by World Racing Group. The series primarily races on dirt ovals in the Northeastern United States and Canada along with select dates in Florida and North Carolina.

The cars feature big block V8 engines (up to 467 c.i.) that develops over 750 hp and a center-steer style chassis that weighs at least 2,500 lb with driver included.

History
The series was founded in 1972 by Glenn Donnelly as a series of qualifier races for the inaugural Super Dirt Week at the New York State Fairgrounds Racetrack in Syracuse, New York. The series became a true points championship in 1974 that also awarded a points fund. Will Cagle won the first points championship in 1974 over two-time Super DIRT Week champion Buzzie Reutimann.

The series and Super Dirt Week grew in popularity along with corporate title sponsors & television coverage throughout the 1980s and 1990s. Past series title sponsors include Schaefer Beer (1972–1975 and 1978), CRC Industries  (1979–1985), Sun Country Cooler (1986), U.S. Smokeless Tobacco Company (1987–1998) and Advance Auto Parts (1999–2008).

The series briefly included asphalt races on the championship trail from 1988 to 1992 at tracks such as Cayuga, Flemington, Nazareth, Oswego, Sanair and Thompson.

The series was acquired by World Racing Group (then Boundless Motorsports) in 2003.

The crown jewel event of the series, Super Dirt Week had to changed venues for the first time in 2016 to a dirt-covered Oswego Speedway in Oswego, New York following the demise & razing of the New York State Fairgrounds Racetrack.

Cars

Specifications
 Engine: Max cubic inches 467
 Fuel system: Carburetor only 4 barrel Holley 950-1050 cfm
 Horsepower: range 650-800 hp
 Compression ratio: 13–14.5 :1
 RPM: 7000-8300
 Speed: Approximately 160 mph at the Syracuse Mile
 Powertrain: 2 speed trans 1 reverse plus quick change rear end.
 Lubrication system: Belt driven dry sump (app 13qts.)
 Fuel: VP Fuels racing gasoline only
 Wheelbase: 106”- 110”
 Thread width: 74” min. to 86” max.
 Weight: 2500 lbs. min. with driver
 Chassis: 1018, 1020 steel only
 Suspension: Mostly coil spring (coil over) or Torison Bar, rear. Coil spring (coil over), front.
 Ground clearance: App. 5” front 6” rear on frame heights.
 Minimum ground clearance: 2½”
 Tire brand: Hoosier Racing Tire
 Right rear tire: Circumference 92½”
 Wheels: Aluminum (bead lock)
 Steering system: Power steering (worm and sector)
 Brakes: 4 wheel hydraulic disc brakes (no power assist)

Events
The premiere event for the series is the Billy Whittaker Cars & Trux 200, apart of NAPA Auto Parts Super DIRT Week which is currently held at the Oswego Speedway in Oswego, New York. The race features one of the biggest purses in dirt modified racing with the purse paying $50,000 to the winner. The race was originally held at the New York State Fairgrounds Mile in Syracuse until the track was razed in 2016. Previous broadcasters of Super DIRT Week include CBS Sports Network, Empire Sports Network, ESPN, SPEED & TNN.

Other major events currently on the Super DIRTcar Series schedule include DIRTcar Nationals at Volusia Speedway Park, Hall of Fame 100 at Weedsport Speedway, Mr. DIRT Track USA at Lebanon Valley Speedway and the World of Outlaws World Finals at Charlotte Motor Speedway.

Champions

Champions by year

Rookie of the Year winners

Records
Most career wins: Brett Hearn (120)
Most DIRTcar titles: Matt Sheppard (9)
Most wins in a season: 10 (Brett Hearn 2002, Billy Decker 2008, Matt Sheppard 2016)
Consecutive wins: 5 (Alan Johnson: 1983) 
Most seasons with at least 1 win: Brett Hearn (32)
Consecutive seasons with at least one win: Brett Hearn (22)
Different track wins: Danny Johnson (33)

References

External links
Official website
Series history at official website

Stock car racing series in the United States
Dirt track racing
Dirt track racing in the United States